In philosophy and logic, contingency is the status of propositions that are neither true under every possible valuation (i.e. tautologies) nor false under every possible valuation (i.e. contradictions). A contingent proposition is neither necessarily true nor necessarily false.

Overview
Propositions that are contingent may be so because they contain logical connectives which, along with the truth value of any of its atomic parts, determine the truth value of the proposition. This is to say that the truth value of the proposition is contingent upon the truth values of the sentences which comprise it. Contingent propositions depend on the facts, whereas analytic propositions are true without regard to any facts about which they speak.

Along with contingent propositions, there are at least three other classes of propositions, some of which overlap:
 Tautological propositions, which must be true, no matter what the circumstances are or could be (example: "It is the case that the sky is blue or it is not the case that the sky is blue.").
 Contradictions which must necessarily be untrue, no matter what the circumstances are or could be (example: "It's raining and it's not raining.").
 Possible propositions, which are true or could have been true given certain circumstances (examples: x + y = 4 which is true with some values of x and y, but false with others; Or there are only three planets which may be true since we may be talking about a different world which itself could be real or hypothetical. The same is true for There are more than three planets ). Every necessarily true proposition, and every contingent proposition, is also a possible proposition.

In medieval Scholasticism contingency regarded not solely the freedom of the Most Holy Trinity not to create the universe, but also the order and concatenation of natural events.

In the 16th century Scotism and the European Reformed Scholasticism discovered the John Duns Scotus' idea of synchronic contingency, which was able to remove contradictions between necessity, human freedom and the free will of God to create the world.
According to the Ethics of Baruch Spinoza, a thing is called contingent when "we do not know whether the essence does or does not involve a contradiction, or of which, knowing that it does not involve a contradiction, we are still in doubt concerning the existence, because the order of causes escape us." It is in the nature of reason to perceive things under a certain form of eternity as necessary and it is only through our imagination that we consider things, whether in respect to the future or the past, as contingent.

Relativism in rhetoric
Attempts in the past by philosophers and rhetoricians to allocate to rhetoric its own realm have ended with attempting to contain rhetoric within the domain of contingent and relative matters. Aristotle explained in Rhetoric, "The duty of rhetoric is to deal with such matters as we deliberate upon without arts or systems to guide us..." Aristotle stresses the contingent because no one deliberates on the necessary or impossible. He believed that the "unavoidable and potentially unmanageable presence of multiple possibilities" or the complex nature of decisions creates and invites rhetoric. Aristotle's view challenges the view of Plato, who said that rhetoric had no subject matter except for deceit, and gives rhetoric its position at the pinnacle of political debate.

Contemporary scholars argue that if rhetoric is merely about the contingent, it automatically excludes that which is either necessary or impossible. The "necessary" is that which either must be done or will inevitably be done. The "impossible" is that which will never be done; therefore, it will not be deliberated over. For example, the United States Congress will not convene tomorrow to discuss something necessary, such as whether or not to hold elections, or something impossible, such as outlawing death. Congress convenes to discuss problems, different solutions to those problems, and the consequences of each solution.

This again raises the question of contingency because that which is deemed necessary or impossible depends almost entirely on time and perspective. In United States history, there was a time when even a congressman who opposed slavery would conclude that its retraction would be impossible. The same held true for those who favored women's suffrage. Today in the United States, slavery has been abolished and women have the right to vote. In this way, although rhetoric viewed across time is entirely contingent and includes a broader definition, rhetoric taken moment-by-moment is much more narrow and excludes both the necessary and the impossible. When faced with decisions, people will choose one option at the exclusion of the others. This inevitably produces unforeseen consequences. Because of these consequences, decision makers must deliberate and choose. Another problem arises when one asks where this knowledge of what issues are "necessary" and "impossible" originates and how the knowledge can be applied to others.

Rhetorician Robert L. Scott answers this problem by asserting that while rhetoric is indeed contingent and relative, it is also epistemic. Thus, for Scott, what should be debated is a matter of rhetoric, as individuals make meaning through language and determine what constitutes truth, and therefore, what is beyond question and debate. Theorist Lloyd Bitzer makes five assumptions about rhetoric in his book Rhetoric, Philosophy, and Literature: An Exploration.

 Rhetoric is a method for inquiring into and communicating about the contingent.
 This inquiry does not yield certain knowledge, but only opinion.
 The proper mode of working in this realm is deliberation that relies on reasonable judgment.
 This deliberation and decision making is audience centered.
 This engagement with the audience is constrained by time.

The study of contingency and relativism as it pertains to rhetoric draws from poststructuralist and postfoundationalist theory. Richard Rorty and Stanley Fish are leading theorists in this area of study at the intersection of rhetoric and contingency.

References

Modal logic
Propositions
Sentences by type